George Scott Romney (born June 7, 1941) is an American Republican politician and lawyer in the state of Michigan. He formerly sat on the Michigan State University Board of Trustees. A member of the Pratt-Romney family, he is the elder son of former Michigan Governor and 1968 presidential candidate George W. Romney and brother of the former Massachusetts Governor, 2012 Republican presidential nominee, and current U.S. Senator Mitt Romney. He goes by his middle name of "Scott" in order to distinguish himself from his father.

Life and career 
Romney received his B.A. in economics from Michigan State University in 1966 and his J.D. from Harvard Law School in 1969. In 1976, he joined the law firm Honigman Miller Schwartz & Cohn, LLP in Detroit. Prior to that, Scott Romney practiced law with Sullivan & Cromwell in New York City.  He also served as president of the Lakeway Corporation in Austin, Texas. He served as a member of the board of directors of the Compuware Corporation. He also served on the board of directors for Blue HealthCare Bank.
 
He was active in Hospice of Michigan, Convergence Transportation Electronics Association, The Children's Center of Wayne County, the National Conference for Community and Justice, Detroit Area Council of Boy Scouts of America, and New Detroit.

Romney has been married four times. He married Ronna Stern in 1967. They raised five children before divorcing in 1992. In 1994 Romney married Ellen Rogers. They divorced in 2010. On July 1, 2011, he married Sheri L. (Cope) Jelalian, widow of D. Reid Jelalian, in Kapolei, Hawaii. That marriage also ended in divorce, in March, 2016. On November 26, 2016, he married Carrie Dimas. They bring a combined total of 14 children to the current marriage. With Ronna Romney, he has five children: Kevin, George, Ronna (now Ronna Romney McDaniel, head of the Republican National Committee), Mark, Christina. With Ellen Rogers, he has two children: Madison and Griffin. He also has nine grandchildren: Abigail, Nash, Isabella, Adelyn, Lucy, Camilla, Roxanne, Zoe, and Theodore.

Political involvement 
In 1998, Romney announced his candidacy for the office of Michigan Attorney General
. That office had been held for 37 years by one person, Democrat Frank Kelley.  However, for health reasons, Kelley announced his retirement in 1998. The Republican Governor at the time, John Engler, had backed U.S. Attorney John Smietanka against Kelley, despite the strong likelihood that Kelley would easily win re-election.  However, upon Kelley's surprising announcement that he was not seeking re-election, Engler switched from supporting Smietanka to supporting Scott Romney for the Republican nomination.  What followed was a power struggle at the Michigan Republican Party convention with influential Michigan Republican and Smietanka supporter Chuck Yob. Romney lost his bid for the nomination to become Michigan Attorney General; Smietanka won the nomination.  Smietanka went on to lose the attorney general's race in the general election to the Democratic Party candidate, attorney Jennifer Granholm.

Governor Engler subsequently appointed Scott Romney to the Michigan State University Board of Trustees in August 2000. Romney ran for and won a full eight-year term in November 2000.  He was defeated for reelection by Dianne Byrum in November 2008.

Religious service
Romney has served as a full-time missionary in the British Isles and bishop in the Church of Jesus Christ of Latter-day Saints.

References 

American leaders of the Church of Jesus Christ of Latter-day Saints
American Mormon missionaries
Romney, Scott, G.
Harvard Law School alumni
Living people
Michigan lawyers
Michigan Republicans
Michigan State University alumni
Mitt Romney
Romney family
1941 births
Sullivan & Cromwell people
Latter Day Saints from Michigan